Aleksandr Artemida is a Russian sprint canoeist who competed in the late 1990s and early first decade of the 21st century. He won two medals at the ICF Canoe Sprint World Championships with a gold (C-2 200 m: 1999) and a silver (C-4 500 m: 2002).

References

Living people
Russian male canoeists
Year of birth missing (living people)
ICF Canoe Sprint World Championships medalists in Canadian